is a Japanese professional footballer who plays as an attacking midfielder for Ventforet Kofu, on loan from Sanfrecce Hiroshima.

Club career
Dohi was born in Osaka Prefecture on April 13, 2001. He joined J1 League club Sanfrecce Hiroshima from youth team in 2019. On May 22, he debuted as substitute midfielder against Melbourne Victory FC at AFC Champions League.

Career statistics

Club

References

External links

2001 births
Living people
Association football people from Osaka Prefecture
Japanese footballers
Japan youth international footballers
Association football midfielders
J1 League players
J2 League players
Sanfrecce Hiroshima players
Mito HollyHock players
Ventforet Kofu players